Edward C. Werner (May 26, 1850 in Milwaukee, Wisconsin – January 24, 1939) was a member of the Wisconsin State Assembly. He was born on May 26, 1850, in Milwaukee, Wisconsin, where he received a religious-based education. Werner was additionally a justice of the peace.

References

Politicians from Milwaukee
American justices of the peace
1850 births
1939 deaths
Democratic Party members of the Wisconsin State Assembly